Nino Dadeshkeliani (June 17, 1890 – 1931), a Georgian author, was the daughter of General Prince Alexander Dadeshkeliani and Princess Eristavi. Her father, an inspector of State Forests, was assassinated in 1909.

During World War I, Dadeshkeliani joined the Russian Army, and served with the 4th Tartar Regiment. She drove an ambulance on the Austrian front before being wounded in 1916.

After the war, Dadeshkeliani lived in Georgia and served in the Constituent Assembly of the Democratic Republic of Georgia. However, when Soviet Russia took control of the country in March 1921, the family moved to Paris. An account of Dadeshkeliani's wartime experiences, Princess in Uniform, was published in 1934.

See also
List of ambulance drivers during World War I
List of Georgian women writers

References
 Spartacus article

1890 births
1931 deaths
Nino
Memoirists from Georgia (country)
Women in World War I
People of World War I from Georgia (country)
Russian military personnel of World War I
Women in the Russian and Soviet military
Women soldiers
Women memoirists
Democratic Republic of Georgia
Georgian exiles
Georgian emigrants to France
20th-century writers from Georgia (country)
20th-century women writers from Georgia (country)
20th-century women politicians from Georgia (country)
20th-century politicians from Georgia (country)
20th-century memoirists